Paradocus is a genus of longhorn beetles of the subfamily Lamiinae, containing the following species:

 Paradocus albithorax (Breuning, 1938)
 Paradocus albovittatus Breuning, 1938
 Paradocus griseovittatus Breuning, 1940
 Paradocus kenyensis Téocchi & Sudre, 2002
 Paradocus maculicollis Breuning, 1956
 Paradocus multifasciculatus Breuning, 1961

References

Theocridini